C. Rohit Yadav (born 8 December 1995) is an Indian badminton player.

Achievements

BWF International Challenge/Series 
Men's singles

  BWF International Challenge tournament
  BWF International Series tournament
  BWF Future Series tournament

References

External links 
 

1995 births
Living people
Indian male badminton players